Yorkshire County Cricket Club was officially founded on 8 January 1863 and its team was elevated to first-class status in the same year. It is one of eighteen county teams in England and Wales that play first-class cricket. The player appointed club captain leads the team in all fixtures except if unavailable.

 1863 – 1872 Roger Iddison – champions 1867, 1870; shared 1869 (note that these titles are unofficial)
 1873 – 1873 Joseph Rowbotham
 1874 – 1874 Luke Greenwood
 1875 – 1875 Joseph Rowbotham (second term)
 1876 – 1877 Ephraim Lockwood
 1878 – 1882 Tom Emmett
 1883 – 1910 Lord Hawke – champions 1893, 1896, 1898, 1900, 1901, 1902, 1905, 1908
 1911 – 1911 Everard Radcliffe
 1912 – 1918 Archibald White – champions 1912
 1919 – 1921 Cecil Burton – champions 1919
 1922 – 1924 Geoffrey Wilson – champions 1922, 1923, 1924
 1925 – 1927 Arthur Lupton – champions 1925
 1928 – 1929 Sir William Worsley
 1930 – 1930 Alan Barber
 1931 – 1932 Frank Greenwood – champions 1931, 1932
 1933 – 1947 Brian Sellers – champions 1933, 1935, 1937, 1938, 1939, 1946
 1948 – 1955 Norman Yardley – shared title 1949
 1956 – 1957 Billy Sutcliffe
 1958 – 1959 Ronnie Burnet – champions 1959
 1960 – 1962 Vic Wilson – champions 1960, 1962
 1963 – 1970 Brian Close – champions 1963, 1966, 1967, 1968
 1971 – 1978 Geoff Boycott
 1979 – 1980 John Hampshire
 1981 – 1982 Chris Old
 1982 – 1983 Ray Illingworth
 1984 – 1986 David Bairstow
 1987 – 1989 Phil Carrick
 1990 – 1995 Martyn Moxon
 1996 – 2001 David Byas – champions 2001
 2002 – 2002 Darren Lehmann
 2003 – 2003 Anthony McGrath
 2004 – 2006 Craig White
 2007 – 2008 Darren Gough
 2009 – 2009 Anthony McGrath (second term)
 2010 – 2016 Andrew Gale – champions 2014, 2015
 2017 - 2018 Gary Ballance
 2018 - 2022 Steven Patterson
 2023-present Shan Masood

See also
 List of Yorkshire County Cricket Club players

Notes

Yorkshire cricket captains
cricket
Yorkshire County Cricket Club